The Thriller is a 2010 Indian Malayalam-language action thriller film written and directed by B. Unnikrishnan. It stars Prithviraj Sukumaran, Siddique, Lalu Alex, Catherine Tresa and Sampath Raj in pivotal roles. It was released on 17 November. Later on, it was dubbed in Hindi under the same title. The film is based on the murder case of renowned financer Paul Muthoot.

Plot

The film is based on the murder case of a rich playboy which formed the headlines in the media of Kerala for more than three months. The case had attracted attention for its mysterious planning and execution.

Cast

Prithviraj Sukumaran as DCP Niranjan IPS
Siddique as ADGP Balagopal IPS
 An Ex-Police officer
Lalu Alex as IG Thomas Mathew IPS
Prajin as Simon Joseph Palathungal (a Charecter based on Paul Muthoot)
Catherine Tresa as Meera Krishnakumar
Anand as DIG Manmohan IPS, City Police Commissioner
Sampath Raj as Martin Dinakar
P. Sreekumar as ACP Shihabudeen
Subair as CI Alex
Vijayaraghavan as Sadhasivan
 Niranjan's Father and an Ex-Sub Inspector
Riyaz Khan as Paramada Subhash
Mallika Kapoor as Meghna Gupta
Uma as Meera's Mother
M. R. Gopakumar as Adv.Uthaman Pillai
 Meera's uncle
Kollam Thulasi as Narayanan, Chief Minister of Kerala 
Shivaji Guruvayoor as DGP Eapen Mathew IPS
Tosh Christy as Joshua
Dinesh Panicker as Joseph Palathingal
Kishor Satya as Jacob, Simon Joseph's Brother
Mamta Mohandas as Special Appearance
V. K. Baiju as Sub Inspector Philipose
Sasi Kalinga as ASI Shivarajan
Pawan as Udayabhanu

Production 
The Thriller was the fifth consecutive super star project of B. Unnikrishnan, the previous ones being Smart City, I G Inspector General, Madambi and Pramaani starring Suresh Gopi, Mohanlal and Mammootty.
 In The Thriller, he teams up with Prithviraj, constantly hailed by media as an upcoming superstar. The director once again chose a contemporary investigative story that takes viewers on a breathless roller coaster ride of suspense and intrigue. Unnikrishnan said he spent several months studying similar cases and the investigative methods of the police, including the working of the cyber cell to come up with a logical narrative.

Prithviraj plays a tough and canny cop who is investigating the murder, in the film. "This is the first time I am acting as a police officer who is tracking a killer. It is an out-and-out suspense thriller," says Prithviraj. Although he has donned the khaki in several films, he is the first time playing a role that has him investigating a specific case. The director has also cast several new faces in the film to play important characters. While Prajan plays the young entrepreneur (Simon Palathingal) who is mysteriously found dead on the highway, Miss South India runnerup Katherine plays the female lead in the film. Mallika Kapoor also plays an important character. Tamil actor Sampath Raj has been cast in a negative role.

The first schedule of The Thriller is taking place in and around Thiruvananthapuram, Kovalam and Vizhinjam. The second schedule of the film is likely to take place in a foreign country.

Soundtrack

References

External links
  
 

2010 crime thriller films
2010 films
2010s Malayalam-language films
2010s police procedural films
Fictional portrayals of the Kerala Police
Films directed by B. Unnikrishnan
Films scored by Dharan Kumar
Films shot in Thiruvananthapuram
Indian crime thriller films